Robert Noel "Duke" Bonnett, OBE (1 September 1916 – 21 April 1994) was an Australian politician. Born in Brisbane, he was educated at state schools before becoming a sales manager at Townsville. He served in the military 1941–45. In 1966, he was elected to the Australian House of Representatives as the Liberal member for Herbert, defeating sitting Labor MP Ted Harding. He held the seat until his retirement in 1977. Bonnett died in 1994.

References

Liberal Party of Australia members of the Parliament of Australia
Members of the Australian House of Representatives for Herbert
Members of the Australian House of Representatives
Officers of the Order of the British Empire
1916 births
1994 deaths
Politicians from Brisbane
People from Townsville
20th-century Australian politicians
Australian Army personnel of World War II
Australian Army officers